Lansdowne, one of Masterton's largest suburbs, is on the left bank of the Waipoua stream at the north-western end of Masterton, New Zealand. On the town's highest ground it provides broad vistas of much of the Wairarapa Valley.
It is further distinguished from the rest of the town by having been subdivided late in the 19th century and because it was administered by the Masterton County Council. It was amalgamated with Masterton Borough in 1921. 

Lansdowne was named by an early settler, J. Valentine Smith, who named his station after his father-in-law's station in New South Wales. His 2,085 acre estate was bought in 1884 by T. C. Williams.

Parts of Lansdowne, Lansdowne Hill and Lansdowne Terrace, are more affluent than most other Masterton suburbs.  The property prices are helped by the suburb's views of the Tararua Ranges, the presence of a retirement village and two golf courses, on the top of the hill and at Mahunga by the Waipoua stream.

Demographics

Lansdowne had a population of 4,311 at the 2018 New Zealand census, an increase of 393 people (10.0%) since the 2013 census, and an increase of 444 people (11.5%) since the 2006 census. There were 1,686 households. There were 2,049 males and 2,262 females, giving a sex ratio of 0.91 males per female, with 756 people (17.5%) aged under 15 years, 693 (16.1%) aged 15 to 29, 1,725 (40.0%) aged 30 to 64, and 1,131 (26.2%) aged 65 or older.

Ethnicities were 84.3% European/Pākehā, 19.8% Māori, 4.0% Pacific peoples, 5.4% Asian, and 1.3% other ethnicities (totals add to more than 100% since people could identify with multiple ethnicities).

The proportion of people born overseas was 13.5%, compared with 27.1% nationally.

Although some people objected to giving their religion, 46.7% had no religion, 40.9% were Christian, 1.0% were Hindu, 0.1% were Muslim, 0.5% were Buddhist and 2.4% had other religions.

Of those at least 15 years old, 531 (14.9%) people had a bachelor or higher degree, and 828 (23.3%) people had no formal qualifications. The employment status of those at least 15 was that 1,539 (43.3%) people were employed full-time, 516 (14.5%) were part-time, and 126 (3.5%) were unemployed.

Transport
Lansdowne is served by a suburban bus service, which runs four times a day on weekdays, connecting suburban residents to Masterton's CBD. Central Lansdowne is also approximately 2.8 km from Masterton railway station, which runs commuter trains from Masterton, through the Wairarapa Line, terminating at Wellington railway station.

Education

Lansdowne School and Totara Drive Schools were closed by the Ministry of Education in 2004 due to expected roll drops.

References

Suburbs of Masterton